Zygodactylidae is a family of extinct birds found in Europe and North America from the Eocene epoch to the Middle Miocene. First named in 1971, based on fragmentary remains of two species from Germany, a more complete description of the birds became possible in 2008 when a number of other, better-preserved fossil species were assigned to the family based on a number of shared characteristics.

The name of the group comes from the presence of a zygodactyl foot, with two toes projecting forward, and two to the rear. This is the same arrangement as seen in living parrots and woodpeckers, and the zygodactylids were at one time thought to be related to the woodpecker family. More recent analyses, however, have shown that they are more likely to be the sister clade to the passerine or "perching" birds, the large clade that includes, among others, all living songbirds. Passerine birds are distinguished by an anisodactyl foot, but it is thought that their earliest ancestors may have been zygodactyl, likely using this arrangement of toes to cling to the bark of trees as woodpeckers do. Only later did the fourth toe rotate from the rear to face forward in the modern passerine fashion.

Species
† Family Zygodactylidae
 Genus Eozygodactylus, Weidig 2010
 Eozygodactylus americanus, Weidig 2010
 Genus Primoscens, Harrison & Walker 1977
 Primoscens minutus, Harrison & Walker 1977
 Genus Primozygodactylus, Mayr 1998
 Primozygodactlyus ballmanni, Mayr 1998
 Primozygodactlyus danielsi, Mayr 1998
 Primozygodactlyus eunjooae, Mayr & Zelenkov 2009
 Primozygodactlyus major, Mayr 1998
 Primozygodactlyus quintus, Mayr 2017
 Genus Zygodactylus, Ballmann 1969
 Zygodactlyus grandei, Smith, DeBee & Clark 2018
 Zygodactlyus grivensis, Ballmann 1969
 Zygodactlyus ignotus, Ballmann 1969

References

Neognathae
 Eocene first appearances
Prehistoric birds of Europe
Prehistoric bird families
Prehistoric birds of North America